Underground Music Movement (UMM) is an Italian House Music label based in Naples by Angelo Tardio that signed artists such as Alex Party Visnadi, Fathers of Sound, Blast just to mention few

References

Italian record labels